Moira Anne Elizabeth Astin (née Williams; born 18 February 1965) is an Anglican priest: she has been the Archdeacon of Reigate in the Church of England since 30 October 2016.
 
Astin was educated at Clare College, Cambridge and Wycliffe Hall, Oxford; and ordained in 1996. She was a curate at St Nicolas, Newbury from 1995 to 1999; Team Vicar of Thatcham from 1999 to 2005; Vicar, St James, Woodley from 2005 to 2011; and Vicar of Frodingham with New Brumby from 2011 until her appointment as archdeacon.

References

1965 births
Alumni of Clare College, Cambridge
Alumni of Wycliffe Hall, Oxford
Archdeacons of Reigate
Living people